"A Perfect Stranger" was the tenth episode of the third series of the British television series, Upstairs, Downstairs. The episode is set in 1913.

Cast

Guest cast
 Gregory Wilmot (Keith Barron )

Plot
Rose has become engaged to Gregory Walter Wilmot, a British sheep farmer living in Australia, who professes socialist views. They first meet on a tram in April 1914 when he accidentally sits on a plum cake she is carrying. They soon start courting. Gregory proposes on 12 April 1914 and gives Rose an engagement ring.

Gregory takes Rose to visit his friends. There, a childhood friend (and former love interest) of Gregory's becomes jealous and sneeringly declares that Gregory would be marrying below himself should he wed Rose. His other friends are more supportive, and encourage her to marry him. Rose agrees to go back to Australia with him and become his wife, but hesitant and fearful, she changes her mind at the last minute.

See also 
 Home Fires (Upstairs, Downstairs)

References 

Upstairs, Downstairs (series 3) episodes
1974 British television episodes
Fiction set in 1913